Gustavo Ramon do Nascimento or simply Gustavo (born July 8, 1977 in Uberlândia) is a Brazilian former footballer who played as a goalkeeper.

Honours
Santa Catarina State League: 2002, 2003, 2004, 2008
 Campeonato Pernambucano in 2006 with Sport Recife

External links
sambafoot
cbf

1977 births
Living people
Brazilian footballers
Grêmio Esportivo Novorizontino players
Nacional Atlético Clube (SP) players
Figueirense FC players
People from Uberlândia
Sport Club do Recife players
Santa Cruz Futebol Clube players
Association football goalkeepers
Sportspeople from Minas Gerais